Premaloka is a 1987 romantic musical film, written and directed by V. Ravichandran in his directorial debut and produced by N. Veeraswamy under the banner Sri Eshwari Productions. The film was based on the 1982 movie Grease 2. The film was made simultaneously in Kannada and Tamil, the latter titled Paruva Ragam. It stars V. Ravichandran in the lead role alongside debutant Juhi. Leelavathi and Lokesh play supportive roles in the Kannada version while Jai Shankar and Manorama reprise their respective roles in the Tamil version. Vishnuvardhan, Ambareesh, Prabhakar, Srinath, and Urvashi made guest appearances in the film. Thengai Srinivasan, Cho Ramaswamy and Delhi Ganesh portray the respective roles of Ambareesh, Prabhakar, and Srinath, in the Tamil version.

Plot 
Ravi is a happy-go-lucky young man attending a college with a strict, results-focused principal who conflicts with an easy-going professor named Manohar. After passing his exams with a first class result, a joyous Ravi engages in various mischievous acts and ends up coming home dirty; his parents dislike his appearance and are unimpressed by his results, leaving him to confide in the family maid Sharadamma that he has never felt loved by his biological parents and she is the only one he sees as family. Nevertheless, he happily goes to the college afterwards (Geleyare Nanna Gelathiyare). One day, Ravi accidentally meets Shashikala, a young woman who the male merchants at the market are struck by and harass, when she throws an egg at him while he skates, causing him to fall on her (Ee Nimbe Hanninantha). Shashikala is admitted to the same college as Ravi; on her first day, she is warned by the principal that he doesn't tolerate any sort of "fooling around" and has to deal with the unrequited attention of her male classmates, but ends up meeting Ravi again in Professor Manohar's class, who falls in love with her and nicknames her "Shashi" (Nodamma Hudugi).

On the occasion of the university's diamond jubilee, the director wishes to hold a ceremony to celebrate and get donations. The principal's suggestion of a small pooja is rebuked, and Manohar is instead chosen to plan a grand spectacle with the other students (Cheluve Ondu Kelthini). Some rowdies try to derail the planning, but they are held off and the stage is set up without a hitch. However, Shashikala is accosted by the gang and has to hide; unfortunately, she runs into Ravi, who is trying to give her a rose. Despite his obliviousness, they manages to escape. Preparations continue, with Ravi continuing to pursue Shashikala but failing to attract her. The rowdies again harass the students and all hope seems lost after they beat up the students who stand in their way. However, a mysterious biker rescues them and beats the rogues up; Shashikala falls in love with him (Yaarivanu Ee Manmathanu). He offers her a ride, but he has to leave when the police arrives, so he gives her his jacket.

Obsessed, Shashikala continues to reject Ravi's advances while fantasizing over the mysterious biker and clutching to his jacket, which confuses her mother and friends (Boy Friend Barthaanantha). Finally, one day the biker meets up with her and they romantically ride together. The night of the show comes around, and the students' musical performance is a big hit (Premalokadinda). However, the gang comes back to disrupt the afterparty, and Shashikala ends up fainting from the chaos. The biker again saves the students, Shashikala regains consciousness to see him. He takes off his helmet and reveals that he is actually Ravi; hesitant at first, Shashikala accepts his love. They roam together happily (E Gangu Ee Biku Kalisikodu) and her love for him deepens (Bathroominalli), but Ravi's parents have arranged his marriage to the Chief Minister's daughter, Rajini, as a way of gaining prestige. Rajini tries to find Ravi with the help of the principal and a cop who happens to be the father of Shashikala. Meanwhile, Shashikala and Ravi continue to roam the countryside, still madly in love (Idu Nanna Ninna Prema Geethe). However, this comes to an end when the principal informs her of Ravi's arranged marriage; thinking he cheated her, she runs away from him heartbroken.

Although he runs behind and tries to catch her, the rowdies from earlier slow him down and she ultimately gets in her father's police jeep. As she is driven away, Shashikala throws the newspaper announcing the arrangement; Ravi finally releases what has happened and goes home. where he is scolded for what he has done. Although his parents ask Sharadamma to convince him to accept the marriage, he instead becomes angrier and trashes his room in a fit of rage. Meanwhile, Shashikala is yelled at and slapped by her parents for daring to love. Finally, Ravi goes to Shashikala's house and angrily sings and yells his grievances while jumping around and breaking more things (Mosagaarana). Realizing her love for him, the two emotionally reunite and run away the next morning. In response, Shashikala's father claims that Ravi kidnapped Shashikala and sends the police, but they fail to catch them. Swapping positions with a couple in a wedding procession, they are about to tie the knot when the principal, Professor Manohar and their parents confront them. Ravi stirringly argues that love is a human right and they should be allowed to marry; after Professor Manohar, Rajini and the Chief Minister intervene to explain why the couple is right, the parents relent and bless their union. As soon as they are married, though, they escape to the countryside to continue their romantic activities.

Cast

Production 
The film marked the directorial debut of V. Ravichandran. For the lead actress, Ravichandran rejected 52 girls before choosing Juhi Chawla as the heroine. Apart from composing music, Hamsalekha has also written lyrics for all songs and dialogues for the film. When Ravichandran was mulling over the theme of the film, Hamsalekha suggested him to do a musical script on the lines of The Sound of Music and Grease 2.

Jolly Bustin who went on to become a stunt master worked as a body double for Ravichandran.

Soundtrack 

Hamsalekha composed the music for the film (in his Tamil debut) and also penned the lyrics for the Kannada soundtrack while Vairamuthu penned the lyrics for the Tamil soundtrack. The soundtrack album consists of eleven tracks. The distribution rights were bought by Lahari Music for a hitherto record price of 150,000.

The music and the songs in the film were widely appreciated and created records in the audio cassette sales during the time.  Tulsiram Naidu (Lahari Velu) of Lahari Audio, says, "Premaloka continues to be the biggest hit among film music albums in Kannada cinema. Back then audio rights were sold for a pittance and nominally paid 100 or 1,000. With Premaloka things changed and rights began to be sold in lakhs". The lyrics of the soundtrack also received acclaim from critics.

The soundtrack sold 38 lakhs  (3.8million) units, setting a record for South Indian soundtrack albums.

The lyrics of two songs from Grease 2 – Back to School Again and Who's That Guy? were retained as  Hogona Kaalejige and  Yaarivanu, respectively. Another song  Premalokadinda Banda was an adaptation of the 1986 Taiwanese Hokkien pop song Reflections In The Cup ( also known as  "Cup (in the) Shadow")., composed by Taiwanese musician Chen Hong and sung by Taiwanese singer .

Kannada version

Tamil version

Telugu version

Box-office 
The film opened to an underwhelming response for "first few days" and was almost declared as failure "for the first three weeks". However, due to positive word-of-mouth, the film became successful a month after the release. However, Paruva Ragam underperformed due to competition from other bigger films.

Legacy 
One of the songs, Nodamma Hudugi, was reused by Sundeep Malani for his Kanglish film SMS 6260 featuring Diganth, Kiran, Janu. Hamsalekha would go on to compose music for many more Ravichandran films. This film established V. Ravichandran as new entry star in Kannada film industry.

Premaloka was dubbed in Telugu as Premalokam. Juhi Chawla recalling her experiences stated that "My 45-day shoot for Premaloka ensured that going on the set of Qayamat Se Qayamat Tak was a cakewalk. The other good thing about Premaloka was that the team was young, so it was like college buddies hanging out. [..] Since the film was a musical, it was like a party on the set. The only senior person there was our cinematographer. I fondly look back at my stint in Kannada cinema during my early days as the foundation for my career in Bollywood".

Notes

References

External links 
 
Premaloka film songs
Song from Premaloka

1987 films
1980s Kannada-language films
1980s Tamil-language films
Indian multilingual films
Films scored by Hamsalekha
Films directed by V. Ravichandran
1987 directorial debut films
1980s romantic musical films
Indian romantic musical films
1987 multilingual films